Makda Harun (born 1988) is an Ethiopian born Australian marathon runner.

In 2009 she was second in the Paris Half Marathon, won the Cursa de Bombers and finished fourth in the Venice Marathon.

In 2010 she was second in the Daegu Marathon and set a course record at the Venice Marathon.

She won the Sydney Marathon, in both 2016 and 2017, during the second of which she set the course record of 2:28:04.

Personal bests
5000 m : 15:31.21 min, 28 September 2007, Shanghai
10 km road race : 32:39 min, Barcelona
Half Marathon : 1:10:39  h, 15 October 2017, Melbourne
Marathon: 2:26:46 h, 15 April 2012, Paris

References 

1988 births
Living people
Australian female marathon runners
Australian long-distance runners
Ethiopian emigrants to Australia